Noah and the Flood is a ballet choreographed by George Balanchine, co-founder and balletmaster of the New York City Ballet, and Jacques d'Amboise to Stravinsky's The Flood (1962). The premiere took place June 11, 1982, at the New York State Theater, Lincoln Center. The text was chosen and arranged by Robert Craft from Genesis, the Te Deum and Sanctus hymns, and the 15th century York and Chester miracle plays.

Original cast 

Adam Luders
Nina Fedorova
Bruce Padgett
Francisco Moncion
Delia Peters

Articles  
Time magazine, article, Friday, June 22, 1962

Ballets by George Balanchine
New York City Ballet repertory
Ballets by Jacques d'Amboise
Ballets to the music of Igor Stravinsky
1982 ballet premieres